This is a list of Sanskritised mottoes, including but not limited to, in the nations in Indosphere which were historically Indianized as part of Greater India. This list specifically excludes non-educational institutions which have Sanskrit phrases as their mottoes. See also Symbolic usage of Sanskrit.

India

The following is a list of educational institutions that use Sanskrit phrases as their official mottos. 
Acharya Nagarjuna University - satye sarvaṃ pratiṣṭhitam / सत्ये सर्वं प्रतिष्ठितम् / satye sarvaM pratiShThitam (Everything is established in truth)
Adikavi Nannaya University - sarvatra vidyaya vardhate praja (enriching people through education)
All India Institute of Medical Sciences - śarīramādyaṃ khalu dharmasādhanam / शरीरमाद्यं खलु धर्मसाधनम् / shareeramAdyaM khalu dharmasAdhanam (Body alone is the instrument of doing all duties/deeds, Kumarsambhavam)
Amrita Vishwa Vidyapeetham - śraddhāvān labhate jñānam / श्रद्धावान् लभते ज्ञानम् / shraddhAvAn labhate GYaanam (Reverent attains wisdom, Rigveda)
Andhra University - tejasvi nāvadhītamastu / तेजस्वि नावधीतमस्तु / tejasvi naavadhiitamastu (May our knowledge become brilliant)
Veer Bahadur Singh Purvanchal University- tejasvi nāvadhītamastu / तेजस्वि नावधीतमस्तु / tejasvi naavadhiitamastu (May our knowledge become brilliant)
Banaras Hindu University - Vidyayā'mritamașnute / विद्ययाऽमृतमश्नुते / vidyayA amRRitaM ashnute (Eat nectar through knowledge, i.e. be immortal through knowledge)
Banasthali Vidyapith - sā vidyā yā vimuktaye / सा विद्या या विमुक्तये / sA vidyA yA vimuktaye (That is knowledge which liberates)
Bharatiya Vidya Bhavan -  amrita tu vidya  / (Knowledge is nectar) 
Birla Institute of Technology, Mesra, Ranchi - sā vidyā yā vimuktaye / सा विद्या या विमुक्तये / sA vidyA yA vimuktaye (That is knowledge which liberates)
Biju Patnaik University of Technology, Kalinga Vihar, Rourkela, Odisha, India - yogaḥ karmasu kauśalam / योगः कर्मसु कौशलम् / yogaH karmasu kaushalam (excellence in action is yoga)
Birla Institute of Technology and Science, Pilani - jñānaṃ paramaṃ balam / ज्ञानं परमं बलम् / GYaanaM paramaM balam (Knowledge is the supreme power)
Haryana Board of School Education -and Institute of Cost Accountants of India   tamaso mā jyotirgamaya / तमसो मा ज्योतिर्गमय / tamaso mA jyotirgamaya ((Lead us) From Darkness to Light)
Chinmaya Vishwavidyapeeth - विद्यया रक्षिता संस्कृतिः सर्वदा। Knowledge protects culture forever; संस्कृतेर्मानवाः संस्कृता भूरिदा:।। Cultured people share abundantly. 
Central Board of Secondary Education - asato ma sad gamaya / असतो मा सद्गमय / asato mA sadgamaya ((Lead us) From Untruth to Truth)
Chail Military School - sheelam param bhushanam / शीलं परम भूषणं (Character is the Greatest/Highest Virtue)
 Chaitanya Bharathi Institute of Technology - swayam tejaswin bhava(Be self-enlightened)
Cochin University of Science and Technology - tejasvi nāvadhītamastu / तेजस्वि नावधीतमस्तु / tejasvi naavadhiitamastu (May our knowledge become brilliant)
College of Engineering, Trivandrum - karma jyayoghya karmanah
Delhi University - niṣṭhā dhṛtiḥ satyam / निष्ठा धृतिः सत्यम् / niShThA dhRRitiH satyam (Reverent dedication grasps truth)
De Nobili Schools - vidya dadāti vinayam / विद्या ददाति विनयम् (Education gives humility)
Devi Ahilya Vishwavidyalaya - dhiyo yo naḥ pracodayāt / धियो यो नः प्रचोदयात् / dhiyo yo naH prachodayaat (May (the divine savitA) propel our intellect)
G.B. Pant Engg College (GBPEC) Pauri - tamaso mā jyotirgamaya / तमसो मा ज्योतिर्गमय / tamaso mA jyotirgamaya ((Lead us) From Darkness to Light)
GCE, Keonjhar, Odisha - jnanam anantam / ज्ञानं अनन्तम् / jnanam anantam (Knowledge is infinite) 
Gujarat National Law University - ā no bhadrāḥ kratavo yantu viśvataḥ (1.89.1 rigveda) / आ नो भद्राः क्रतवो यन्तु विश्वतः / A no bhadraaH kratavo yantu vishvataH (Let good (thoughts) come from everywhere, from all the world
Guru Jambheshwar University of Science and Technology - jñānaḿ vijñāna-sahitaḿ / ज्ञानं विज्ञान सहितम् (Realized knowledge)
Guru Gobind Singh Indraprastha University -  ज्योतिवृ्णीत तमसो विजानऩ /jyotivranit tamso vijajnam 
Gyanm College of Competitions, Chandigarh -  ज्ञानम सर्वोत्तम सम्पदा /Gyanm Sarvottam Sampada 
Hans Raj College - 	तमसो मा ज्योतिर्गमय / tamaso mA jyotirgamaya 
 Himachal Pradesh University- शस्त्रे शास्त्रे च कौशलम् / shastre shaastre cha kaushalam 
 Hidayatullah National Law University  -  धर्म संस्थापनार्थम / Dharma Sansthapanartham (for the sake of establishing the primacy of the laws of eternal value).
Hislop College - Satyameva Jayate / सत्यमेव जयते (Truth alone triumphs)
Hooghly Collegiate School - tamaso mā jyotirgamaya / तमसो मा ज्योतिर्गमय / tamaso mA jyotirgamaya ((Lead us) From Darkness to Light)
Indian Institute of Technology Kharagpur - yogaḥ karmasu kauśalam / योगः कर्मसु कौशलम् / yogaH karmasu kaushalam (excellence in action is yoga)
Indian Institute of Technology Jodhpur - tvan gyaanamayo vigyaanamayo asi / त्वं ज्ञानमयो विज्ञानमयो असि/ twam gyanmayo vigyanmayo asi (You are the entire Knowledge and Science)
Indian Institute of Technology Bombay - jñānaṃ paramaṃ dhyeyam / ज्ञानं परमं ध्येयम् / GYaanaM paramaM dhyeyam (knowledge is the supreme goal)
Indian Institute of Technology Kanpur - tamaso mā jyotirgamaya / तमसो मा ज्योतिर्गमय / tamaso mA jyotirgamaya ((Lead me) From Darkness to Light)
Harcourt Butler Technical University Kanpur - Shram ev param tapah / "श्रम एवं परं तप:" / Shram ev param tapah ( Labour is real penance)
Indian Institute of Technology Madras - siddhirbhavati karmajā / सिद्धिर्भवति कर्मजा / siddhirbhavati karmajA (success is born of action)
Indian Institute of Technology Patna - vidyarthi labhate vidyam / विद्यार्थी लभते विद्याम / vidyarthi labhate vidyam (One who aspires wisdom, attains it)
Indian Institute of Technology Roorkee - śramam vinā na kimapi sādhyam / श्रमम् विना न किमपि साध्यम् / shramam vinA na kimapi sAdhyam (Without effort nothing is possible)
Indian Institute of Technology Ropar - dhiyo yo na prachodyat (Guide in the right direction)
Indian Institute of Engineering Science and Technology, Shibpur - uttiṣṭha jāgrata prāpya varānnibodhata / उत्तिष्ठ जाग्रत प्राप्य वरान्निबोधत / uttiShTha jAgrata prApya varAnnibodhata (arise, awake, obtaining worthy (teachers), Know (the truth))
Indian Institute of Management Ahmedabad - vidyā viniyogāt vikāsaḥ / विद्या विनियोगात् विकासः / vidyA viniyogAt vikAsaH (Progress comes from proper application of knowledge)
Indian Institute of Management Bangalore - tejasvi nāvadhītamastu / तेजस्वि नावधीतमस्तु / tejasvi naavadhiitamastu (May our knowledge become brilliant)
Indian Institute of Management Indore - siddhi moolam prabandhanam/सिद्धिमुलम प्रबंधनम/ (Achievement is Rooted in Management)
Indian Institute of Management Lucknow - suprabandhe rashtra samriddhi/सुप्रबन्धे राष्ट्र समृद्धि/ (Better Management for a Better Nation)
Indian Institute of Management Kozhikode - yogaḥ karmasu kauśalam / योगः कर्मसु कौशलम् / yogaH karmasu kaushalam (Excellence in action is yoga)
Indian Institute of Information Technology and Management Gwalior - viśvajīvanāmṛtam jñānam / विश्वजीवनामृतम् ज्ञानम् / vishvajeevanAmRRitam GYaanam (Knowledge is the nectar of Life)
Indian Institute of Science Education and Research, Bhopal -  vidyayā amṛtaṃ aśnute / विद्ययाऽमृतमश्नुते / vidyayA amRRitaM ashnute (Eat nectar through knowledge, i.e. be immortal through knowledge)
Indian School of Mines Dhanbad - uttiṣṭha jāgrata prāpya varānnibodhata / उत्तिष्ठ जाग्रत प्राप्य वरान्निबोधत / uttiShTha jAgrata prApya varAnnibodhata (Arise, Awake and Learn by approaching excellent teachers)
Indian Statistical Institute - bhinneṣvaikyasya darśanam / भिन्नेष्वैक्यस्य दर्शनम् / bhinneShvaikyasya darshanam (See one in many) (even in differences, see the unity). "bhinneShu eva ekyasya darshanam")
Institute of Chartered Accountants of India - "Ya Aesh Suptaeshu Jagriti / या एष सुप्तेषु जागर्ति / Ya aesh supteshu jagriti" ( One who is awake in those that sleep)
Institute of Company Secretaries of India - Satyam Vada, Dharmam Chara 
Institute of Engineering and Technology, Lucknow - jñānaṃ bharah kriyam bina / ज्ञानं भारः क्रियां विना / GYaanaM bharah kriyam bina (Knowledge is a load without Experiment)
Indian Law Society's Law College, Pune - Dharme Sarva Pratishthitam 
Jawaharlal Nehru Technological University, Hyderabad - yogaḥ karmasu kauśalam / योगः कर्मसु कौशलम् / yogaH karmasu kaushalam (Excellence in action is yoga)
Jawahar Navodaya Vidyalaya -  prajñānam brahma / प्रज्ञानम ब्रह्म / praj~naanam brahma (Knowledge is the Soul)
Jnana Prabodhini Prashala - avidyaya mrutyum tirtva vidyaya amrutam ashnute/अविद्यया मृत्युं तीर्त्वा विद्यया अमृतं अश्नुते 
Kendriya Vidyalaya - tattvaṃ pūṣanapāvṛṇu / तत्त्वं पूषनपावृणु / tattvaM pUShanapAvRRiNu ((Lord) Remove Thou the Covering (that the Seeker may see the Truth))
Kurukshetra University - yogastha kuru karmāṇi / योगस्थ कुरु कर्माणि / yogastha kuru karmANi (Do while steadfast in yoga)
Lok Nayak Jayaprakash Narayan National Institute of Criminology and Forensic Science, Delhi, India- 
Lady Shri Ram College for Women - sa Vidya va vimuktaye
Maulana Azad National Institute of Technology,Bhopal - vidhya param bhushnam / विद्या परम भूषणम / ( Education is our soul wealth )
Madan Mohan Malaviya University of Technology, Gorakhpur - yogaḥ karmasu kauśalam / योगः कर्मसु कौशलम् / yogaH karmasu kaushalam (Excellence in action is yoga)
The Maharaja Sayajirao University of Baroda, Vadodara - satyaṃ śivaṃ sundaram / सत्यं शिवं सुन्दरम् / satyaM shivaM sundaram (truth, auspiciousness, beauty)
Maharishi Vidya Mandir Schools - gyanam chetnayam nihitam / ज्ञानं चेतनायां निहितम्  
Mahatma Gandhi Kashi Vidyapeeth-  Knowledge Imparts Immortality / विद्ययाऽमृतमश्नुते Malaviya National Institute of Technology -  yogaḥ karmasu kauśalam / योगः कर्मसु कौशलम् / yogaH karmasu kaushalam (Excellence in action is yoga)
 Makhanlal Chaturvedi National University of Journalism and Communication - आ नो भद्राः क्रत वो यन्तु विश्वतः
Management Development Institute - yogaḥ karmasu kauśalam / योगः कर्मसु कौशलम् / yogaH karmasu kaushalam (Excellence in action is yoga)
Manipal University - pragyānam brahm / प्रज्ञानं ब्रह्म / pragyānam brahm (Knowledge is the attainment of God)
Modern School, New Delhi - ""Naimatma Balheenien Labhya"" (Perfection can only be achieved by the strong/The weak cannot achieve perfection)
Motilal Nehru National Institute of Technology, Allahabad - siddhirbhavati karmajā / सिद्धिर्भवति कर्मजा / siddhirbhavati karmajA (Success is born of action)
NITS Polytechnic, Jammu - jñānaṃ paramaṃ balam / ज्ञानं परमं बलम् / GYaanaM paramaM balam (Knowledge is the supreme power)
NALSAR University of Law, Hyderabad - Dharme Sarvam Pratishthitam
National Institute of Foundry and Forge Technology, Hatia - udyog vikas/ उद्योग विकास (Industry is Development)
National Institute of Technology, Durgapur - udyogah purushasya lakshanam / उद्योगः पुरुषस्य लक्षणं / udyogah purushasya lakshanam (Industry is man's objective) 
National Institute of Technology, Goa - Sa Vidya Ya Vimuktaye / सा विद्या या विमुक्तये  (Knowledge is that which liberates)
National Institute of Technology, Hamirpur - Udyamena hi siddhayānti kāryāṇi na manorathaiḥ / उद्यमेन हि सिद्धयान्ति कार्याणि न मनोरथैः / A goal is achieved through labor, not by desire only (from Nīti Śatakaḥ by Bhartṛhari). Full text: Udyamena hi siddhayānti kāryāṇi na manorathaiḥ| na hī suptasya simhasya mukhe praviśanti mṛgaḥ|| (A goal is achieved through labor, not by desire only. As a deer by himself wouldn't enter the mouth of a sleeping lion.)
National Institute of Technology, Kurukshetra - śramonavarata ceṣṭā ca / श्रमोनवरत चेष्टा च / shramonavarata cheShTA cha (Tireless effort and attempt)
National Institute of Technology,Raipur - नित्यं यातो शुभोदयं / Nityam Yato Shubhodayam/Let the rise of goodness happen every day  
National Institute of Technology Karnataka, Surathkal -  तत्पूजा कर्मचाखिलम / Work is worship 
Netaji Subhas University of Technology - ā no bhadrāḥ kratavo yantu viśvataḥ (1.89.1 rigveda) / आ नो भद्राः क्रतवो यन्तु विश्वतः / A no bhadraaH kratavo yantu vishvataH (Let good (thoughts) come from everywhere, from all the world)
N. L. Dalmia Institute of Management Studies and Research - tamaso mā jyotirgamaya / तमसो मा ज्योतिर्गमय / tamaso mA jyotirgamaya (Lead us from Darkness to Light)
National Law School of India University - dharmo rakṣati rakṣitaḥ / धर्मो रक्षति रक्षितः / Dharmo Rakshati Rakshitah (Values protect the protector (of values))
Osmania University- tamaso mā jyotirgamaya / तमसो मा ज्योतिर्गमय / tamaso mA jyotirgamaya (Lead us from Darkness to Light)
Panjab University- tamaso mā jyotirgamaya / तमसो मा ज्योतिर्गमय / tamaso mA jyotirgamaya (Lead us from Darkness to Light)
Rajhans Vidyalaya - vidyā vinayena śobhate / विद्या विनयेन शोभते / vidyA vinayena shobhate(Knowledge graces by humility)
Ramakrishna Mission - ātmano mokṣārthaṃ jagadhitāya ca / आत्मनो मोक्षार्थं जगधिताय च / Atmano mokShArthaM jagadhitAya cha(For one's own salvation, and for the welfare of the world)
Ranchi University - tejasvi nāvadhītamastu / तेजस्वि नावधीतमस्तु / tejasvi naavadhiitamastu (May our knowledge become brilliant)
St. Xavier's School, Bokaro - roopāntarikaraneeyam / रूपांतरीकरणीयं / rOOpantarikaranEEyam (Towards self-transformation)
Sainik School Rewa - vidyaiva balam / विद्यैव बलम् / vidyaiva balam (Knowledge is Power)
Sainik School Balachadi - Yog: Karmsu Kaushalam / योग कर्मसु कौशलम्: / Yogah Karmasu Kaushalam (Excellence in Action is Yoga)
Sainik School, Chittorgarh - na dainyaṃ na palāyanam / न दैन्यं न पलायनम् / na dainyaM na palAyanam (no misery, no running away) (For a soldier, one should not seek mercy nor one should run away from the battlefield)
Sampurnanand Sanskrit University - Sśrutam me gopāya / श्रुतम् मे गोपाय / shrutam me gopaaya (Let my learning be safe, i.e. let it be fruitful, let me not forget my learning)
Samrat Ashok Technological Institute - yogaḥ karmasu kauśalam / योगः कर्मसु कौशलम् / yogaH karmasu kaushalam (Excellence in action is yoga)
Sanskrit Collegiate School, Kolkata - tamaso mā jyotirgamaya / तमसो मा ज्योतिर्गमय / tamaso mA jyotirgamaya (From the darkness to light)
S. P. Jain Institute of Management and Research, Mumbai - अमृतं तु विद्या (Knowledge is Nectar)
Sydenham Institute of Management Studies, Research and Entrepreneurship Education, Mumbai - samudyogo hi vishvajita {Diligent Efforts Conquer the World}.
Symbiosis International University, Pune - Vasudhaiva Kutumbakam (The world is one family)
Sri Sathya Sai Institute of Higher Learning - satyaṃ vada dharmaṃ cara / सत्यं वद धर्मं चर / satyaM vada dharmaM chara (Speak the Truth, Walk the Righteous Path)
Savitribai Phule Pune University - Yah kriyavan sah panditah / यः क्रियावान स पंण्डितः (Where Actions Prove Knowledge) 
Sri Venkateswara University - Jnānam Samyaga VekshanamTezpur University -  Vijñānaṁ yajñaṁ tanutē / विज्ञानं यज्ञं तनुते / Vijñānaṁ yajñaṁ tanutē (Specialized Knowledge Promotes Creativity)
Tilka Manjhi Bhagalpur University - tamaso mā jyotirgamaya / तमसो मा ज्योतिर्गमय / tamaso mA jyotirgamaya (Lead Us from Darkness to Light)
University of Calicut - Nirmaya Karmana SreeUniversity of Delhi - Nishtā Drithih SatyamUniversity of Hyderabad - Sa Vidhya Ya Vimukthaye (Education results in liberation)
University of Kerala - Karmani Vyajyate PrajnaUniversity of Mumbai - shilvritphala vidya / शीलवृतफला विद्या/ shilvritphala vidya (The Fruit of Learning is Good Character and Righteous Conduct)
University of Mysore - na hi jñānena sadṛśam / न हि ज्ञानेन सदृशम् (Nothing is Equal to Knowledge) and satyamEvOddharAmyaham / सत्यमेवोद्धराम्यहम् (I Always Uphold The Truth) 
University of Pune - य: क्रियावान् स पण्डितः / yaH kriyAwAn sa paNDitaH (Learned is the one who is industrious)
University of Rajasthan - Dharmo Vishwasya Jagatah PratishthaUttar Pradesh Technical University - yogaḥ karmasu kauśalam / योगः कर्मसु कौशलम् / yogaH karmasu kaushalam (Excellence in action is yoga)
Vidya Mandir Senior Secondary School - सह वीर्यं करवावहै / saha vIryam karavAvahai (Let the teacher and student together perform great acts of strength)
Visvesvaraya National Institute of Technology, Nagpur - yogaḥ karmasu kauśalam / योगः कर्मसु कौशलम् / yogaH karmasu kaushalam (excellence in action is yoga)
West Bengal Board of Secondary Education - sā vidyā yā vimuktaye / सा विद्या या विमुक्तये / sA vidyA yA vimuktaye (That is knowledge which liberates)
West Bengal Council of Higher Secondary Education - vidyayā amṛtaṃ aśnute / विद्ययाऽमृतमश्नुते / vidyayA amRRitaM ashnute (Eat nectar through knowledge, i.e. be immortal through knowledge)
West Bengal National University of Juridical Sciences - Yuktiheena Vicharetu Dharmahnih Prajayate (Judgement Devoid of Logic Destroys Dharma)
 M. J. P. Rohilkhand University- Charaiveti-Charaiveti / चरैवेति-चरैवेति - (Keep moving, keep moving)
 The Bhawanipur Gujarati Education Society School and Bhawanipur Education Society College- vidyayā amṛtaṃ aśnute / विद्ययाऽमृतमश्नुते / vidyayA amRRitaM ashnute (Eat nectar through knowledge, i.e. be immortal through knowledge)
 Raylaseema University, Kurnool, Andhra Pradesh - Vidyaya Vindate Amrutham
 Bhavan's Gangabux Kanoria Vidyamandir Amrita tu Vidya - (Knowledge is nectar)- Kolkata,West Bengal
 Ramchandrapur High School HS दाने नैव क्षयं याति - Tapan, Dakshin Dinajpur, West Bengal

Indonesia

Diponegoro University: Wiyata Hangreksa Gapuraning NagaraGanesha University of Education: Dharmaning Sajjana Umerdhyaken Vidyaguna (mixture with Balinese)
Indonesian Military Academy: "अधिकाऱ्या महत्व विर्य नगरभक्ति" Adhitakarya Mahatvavirya Nagarabhakti ("Hard-working Knights Serving Bravery as Nation's Hero").
Indonesian Army Command and General Staff College: Viyata Vira JatiIndonesian Army Officer Candidate School: Budi Bhakti Wira Utama 
Indonesian Naval Academy: Hree Dharma Shanty ("Embarrassed for Doing The Defects")
Indonesian Naval Command and General Staff College: Dharma Wiratama  
Indonesian Air Force Academy: Vidya Karma Vira PakchaIndonesian Air Force Command and General Staff College: Pragnya Paramartha JayaIndonesian Air Force Doctrine Development, Education and Training Command: Vidyasana Viveka VardhanaIndonesian Police Academy: Dharma, Bijaksana, Ksatria ("Best-serviced, Wise and Knightful")
Indonesian Police Studies College: Bhakti-Dharma-WaspadaInstitute of Domestic Governance: Among Praja Dharma Satya Nagari BhaktiMahasaraswati University of Denpasar: Gonging Maha Pataka Muddha Hetu (mixture with Balinese)
National Resilience Institute: Tanhana Dharma MangrvaSebelas Maret University: Mangesthi Luhur Ambangun Nagara (mixture with Old Javanese)
The Republic of Indonesia Defense University: Praditya Wiratama Nagara Bhakti.

Malaysia

 University of Malaya - Ilmu Puncha Kemajuan, a mixture of words from Arabi, Sanskrit and Malay, which means "knowledge is the source of progress".

Singapore

Sri Lanka

University of Colombo - Buddhi Sarvathra Bhrajate / बुद्धि सर्वत्र भ्राजते ("Wisdom enlightens")
University of Moratuwa - vidyaiva sarvadhanam / विद्यैव सर्वधनम् / vidyaiva sarvadhanam (Knowledge is the greatest wealth)
University of Peradeniya - sarvasya locanaṃ śāstram / सर्वस्य लोचनं शास्त्रम् / sarvasya lochanaM shAstram (Science is the eye of all)
University of Sri Jayewardenepura - Vijja Uppaththang Settah is Sanskrit for "Science is the Greatest of that which is born"''

Thailand

See also 
 List of Sanskrit universities in India
 List of Sanskrit academic institutes outside India
 List of institutions with Sanskrit mottos
 List of Sanskrit loanwords in English
 List of Sanskrit loanwords in Hindi
 List of Sanskrit loanwords in Indonesian
 List of Sanskrit loanwords in Tagalog
 List of Sanskrit inscriptions in the Malay world
 List of historic Sanskrit texts 
 List of Sanskrit Buddhist literature
 List of legendary creatures in Sanskrit Hindu mythology 
 List of Sanskrit poets
 List of languages by first written accounts
 Sanskrit Wikipedia

References 

Sanskrit Phrases As Mottos
Sanskrit Phrases As Mottos
Indosphere